Deptford Bridge is a Docklands Light Railway (DLR) station in Deptford, London in England. The station is elevated above both local roads and Deptford Creek, and is adjacent to Lewisham College and Deptford market.

Location 
The station is located between Greenwich and Elverson Road stations, and is on the boundary of Travelcard Zone 2 and 3. It is sited in the Royal Borough of Greenwich and is very close to the boundary with the London Borough of Lewisham.

The station layout consists of two elevated side platforms which run roughly north–south over the A2 road and parallel to the River Ravensbourne.

The station was opened in 1999 as part of the southern extension from Island Gardens to Lewisham.

The station was largely reconstructed and considerably enhanced when it was extended to enable 3-car trains to call at it.

Connections
London Buses routes 47, 53, 177, 453 and night route N89 serve the station.

References

External links

 Docklands Light Railway: Deptford Bridge

Docklands Light Railway stations in the Royal Borough of Greenwich
Railway stations in Great Britain opened in 1999